The 1994 Sandown 500 was an endurance motor race for Group 3A Touring Cars and selected production cars held at the Sandown circuit in Victoria, Australia on 4 September 1994. The event was staged over 161 laps of the 3.10 km circuit, a total distance of 499 km. It was the 29th race in a sequence of annual endurance races held at Sandown.

Dick Johnson and John Bowe won the race in their Dick Johnson Racing Ford EB Falcon. Second was the Gibson Motorsport Holden VP Commodore of Mark Skaife and Jim Richards, while third was the Perkins Engineering Commodore of Larry Perkins and Gregg Hansford. After first racing in the "Sandown 500" in 1977 when the race was known as the Hang Ten 400, Dick Johnson scored his first win in the classic.

The race was notable as it marked the debut race of future three-time Supercars champion Craig Lowndes.

Results

Notes
 Pole position: Peter Brock, 1m 22.8269s
 Race time of winning car: 3h 34m 14.4198s
 Fastest lap: Dick Johnson / John Bowe, 1m 14.0747s

See also
1994 Australian Touring Car season

References

External links
 Colin Young, Bowe goes charging to takeout 500 race, The Age, 5 September 1994, Sport Extra, Page 38, via newsstore.fairfax.com.au As archived at web.archive.org
 Image of the winning Ford EB Falcon of Dick Johnson and John Bowe, from d3spxwpngnho1k.cloudfront.ne As archived at webarchive.org

Motorsport at Sandown
Sandown 500
Pre-Bathurst 500